The Blackburn/McCafferty Trophy is the award given to the winner of regular season basketball games between the University of Dayton and Xavier University.

Origin of Competition
The first meeting between the two Catholic universities was a 24-18 victory by Dayton on February 20, 1920. The two schools have maintained an annual meeting since then, frequently meeting twice in one season. The series has been interrupted four times, most recently from 1943-45 due to World War II. Xavier held a commanding early lead in the series until Dayton won 61 of the next 74 games beginning in 1950. The rivalry between the two schools took on added significance beginning in the 1988-89 season when Dayton joined Xavier in the Midwestern Collegiate Conference (now the Horizon League) and again in the 1995-96 season when Dayton and Xavier joined the Atlantic 10 Conference. Dayton has not won against Xavier in Cincinnati since January 10, 1981, a streak that extends to 26 games. Through the 2014-15 season, Dayton leads the all-time series 84–74.  Dayton holds the longest winning streak in the series, with 10 consecutive wins between 1972 and 1977. The longest streak in the Atlantic 10 belongs to both Xavier and Dayton for 150 meetings between the two. Starting in the 2013–14 season, the matchup is once again a non-conference rivalry, after Xavier left the A10 to become a member of the Big East Conference.

The Blackburn/McCafferty Trophy
In the 1980-81 season, the two schools began playing for the Blackburn/McCafferty Trophy during regular season meetings.  Named for former Dayton coach Tom Blackburn and former Xavier coach Jim McCafferty, the award commemorates the two men responsible for raising the national profile of their respective basketball programs.  The winner retains possession of the trophy until the next meeting.  Since the inception of the Blackburn/McCafferty Trophy, Xavier leads 37-20 in the regular season meetings.  Along with the trophy, an MVP is named for the game and scholarship money is raised for each university .

Results
Rankings are from the AP Poll (1936–present)

Source

Notes 
A1956 NIT Quarterfinals
B1958 NIT Finals
C1990 Midwestern Collegiate Conference tournament
D1992 Midwestern Collegiate Conference tournament
E2002 Atlantic 10 tournament
F2004 Atlantic 10 tournament
G2007 Atlantic 10 tournament
H2008 Atlantic 10 tournament
I2010 Atlantic 10 tournament
J2011 Atlantic 10 tournament
K2012 Atlantic 10 tournament
L2015 Advocare Invitational

Game Most Valuable Players

References

College basketball rivalry trophies in the United States
Dayton Flyers men's basketball
Xavier Musketeers men's basketball